Iams is an American brand of dog food and cat food manufactured by Spectrum Brands in Europe and Mars, Incorporated worldwide. The food is formulated for the puppy/kitten, adult and mature stages of life. Iams products are developed by nutritionists and veterinarians and may be found in three main formulas: ProActive Health, Healthy Naturals and Premium Protection. Veterinary formulas for pets with special dietary requirements are also produced.

According to Iams, since 2006, studies have been conducted in pet owners' homes, P&G Pet Care's Pet Health & Nutrition Center and locations where dogs and cats are already living such as assistance dog organizations.

History 
During the 1940s, because pet food was not available in stores, animals were predominantly fed homemade food, usually table scraps. Paul Iams, an animal nutritionist who graduated from The Ohio State University in 1937, founded the Iams Company in 1946 in a small feed mill near Dayton, Ohio. In 1950, he developed the world's first animal-based protein dry dog food and called it Iams 999. In 1969, Iams formulated a new dog food and named it Eukanuba.

In 1973 during the Arab oil embargo, the costs for meat and bone meal tripled, but sale prices in the U.S. were frozen by a nationwide wage and price control issued by President Richard Nixon. Iams did not change the product formula during the price-freeze mandate and the company nearly went bankrupt. Clay Mathile, who had joined Iams in 1970, purchased half of the company in 1975. By 1982, he became its sole owner and president. After expanding the company from $100,000 revenue in 1970 to $900 million in 1999, Mathile sold it to Procter & Gamble (P&G) in September 1999. In July 2006, P&G reorganized the Pet Health & Nutrition division into P&G Pet Care (consisting of the Iams and Eukanuba brands).

In its largest divestiture in five years, Procter & Gamble announced in April 2014 that it would sell its Iams, Eukanuba and Natura pet-food brands in all markets except Europe to Mars, Incorporated for $2.9 billion in cash. P&G said that the deal would allow it to lose a slow performer and generate cash to grow core businesses. The deal for P&G Pet Care's operations in North America and Latin America was completed in August 2014. Mars, Inc. also exercised options to acquire P&G's pet-food business in some parts of Asia Pacific, Middle East and Africa, including Australia, Japan and Singapore. P&G sold its European pet-care business to Spectrum Brands in December 2014.

References

External links 
 

Cat food brands
Dog food brands
Companies based in Dayton, Ohio
American companies established in 1946
Food and drink companies established in 1946
1946 establishments in Ohio
Mars brands
Former Procter & Gamble brands